Georgy Berdyukov (born August 19, 1991) is a Russian ice hockey defenceman. He is currently playing with SKA-Neva of the Supreme Hockey League (VHL) while under contract to SKA Saint Petersburg of the Kontinental Hockey League (KHL).

Berdyukov made his KHL debut playing with SKA Saint Petersburg during the 2010–11 KHL season.

References

External links

1991 births
Living people
Amur Khabarovsk players
HC Lada Togliatti players
Russian ice hockey defencemen
SKA Saint Petersburg players
HC Vityaz players